Chris Standring (born 1 December 1960) is a British jazz guitarist known for his heavy use of 1970s-style musical nuances. Before launching his solo career with his 1998 album Velvet, he represented a third of the band SolarSystem, a band that combined elements of jazz and hip-hop.

Hip Sway was co-produced with Rodney Lee in 2000. Groovalicious followed in 2003, then Soul Express in 2006. Love & Paragraphs (2008) spawned the title track hit radio single. Blue Bolero spawned the hit single "Bossa Blue" which went to No. 1 on contemporary radio across the US and stayed there for nine consecutive weeks. "Bossa Blue" was named 2010 Billboard contemporary jazz track of the year. Electric Wonderland was released on 20 March 2012.

Discography

Studio albums

Live albums

Compilation albums

References

External links
Official website

English jazz guitarists
English male guitarists
Smooth jazz guitarists
1960 births
Living people
People educated at Shiplake College
British male jazz musicians